Gumla subdivision is an administrative subdivision of the Gumla district in the South Chotanagpur division in the state of Jharkhand, India.

History 
Gumla was made a subdivision of Ranchi district in 1902 and it was made a subdivision of Gumla district in 1983 when the latter was made a district.

As of 2022,  Gumla district is divided into three subdivisions – Gumla subdivision (with Gumla, Ghaghra, Bharno, Bishunpur, Raidih and Sisai blocks), Basia subdivision (with Palkot, Basia and Kamdara blocks), and Chainpur subdivision (with Chainpur, Albert Ekka (Jari) and Dumri blocks).

Overview 
The subdivisions of Gumla  district have the following distinctions:

Note: Calculated on the basis of block-wise data available.

Police stations  
Police stations in the Gumla subdivision are at:

Gumla 
Ghaghra 
Bharno 
Bishunpur 
Raidih 
Sisai 
Gurdari

Blocks   
Community development blocks in the Gumla subdivision are:

Education    
In 2011, in the Gumla  subdivision out of a total 511 inhabited villages in 6 CD blocks there were 155 villages with pre-primary schools, 490 villages with primary schools, 244 villages with middle schools, 63 villages with secondary schools, 22 villages with senior secondary schools, 1 village with general degree college, 21 villages with no educational facility.

The only nagar panchayat had 10 primary schools, 9 middle schools, 6 secondary schools, 5 senior secondary schools, 1 general degree college, 2 recognised shorthand, typewriting, and vocational training institutions and 1 non-formal education centre (Sarba Shiksha Abhiyan).   
.*Senior secondary schools are also known as Inter colleges in Jharkhand.

Educational institutions    
The following institutions are located in Gumla subdivision: 
Kartik Oraon College was established at Gumla in 1960. 
B.N.J. College, also known as Baijnath Jalan College, was established at Sisai in 1976.

(Information about degree colleges with proper reference may be added here)

Healthcare    
In 2011, in the Gumla subdivision, in the 6 CD blocks, there were 22 villages with primary health centres, 145 villages with primary health subcentres, 51 villages with maternity and child welfare centres, 21 villages with allopathic hospitals, 14 villages with dispensaries, 6 villages with veterinary hospitals, 15 villages with family welfare centres, 8 villages with medicine shops.

The only nagar panchayat had 2 hospitals, 1 nursing home, 1 charitable hospital/ nursing home, 2 dispensaries, 2 health centres, 8 maternity and child welfare centres, 1 maternity home, 1 family welfare centre, 11 veterinary hospitals, 11 medicine shops.   
.*Private medical practitioners, alternative medicine etc. not included

Medical facilities 
 
(Anybody having referenced information about location of government/ private medical facilities may please add it here)

References    

    

Sub-divisions in Jharkhand